= Yéyamba Wandzé Mdrou Ndo? =

1977 Sudanese romantic film

- Directed by: Arsin Soiby
- Starring: Jacqueline Abdillah; Abderemane Djimby; Djimba; Youssouf Msa
- Cinematography: Arsin Soiby
- Distributed by: HMZ Productions
- Release date: 2000
- Running time: 55 min.
- Country: Comoros
- Language: French

Yéyamba Wandzé Mdrou Ndo?, is a 2000 Comorian comedy drama film directed by Arsin Soiby and produced as a HMZ Productions. The film is the first feature film of Comoros.

== Cast ==
- Jacqueline Abdillah
- Djimba
- Abderemane Djimby
- Zali Hamadi
- Laher
- Youssouf Msa
- Roukia Saïd
- Arsin Soiby
